Mondreville is the name of two communes in France:

 Mondreville, in the Seine-et-Marne département
 Mondreville, in the Yvelines département